Tom Hewitt may refer to:

Tom Hewitt (actor), American performer; stage, TV and film career began in 1981; nominated for a Tony in 2001 for Rocky Horror
Tom Hewitt, English guitarist, keyboard artist and lead singer for the band Clocks, which formed in 2000
Tom Hewitt (rugby league) (born 1985), Australian player; signed with the Brisbane Broncos in 2007 
Tom Hewitt (rugby union) (1905–1991), Irish player
Tom Hewitt (footballer) (1889–1980), Wrexham F.C., Chelsea F.C. and Wales international footballer
Tom Hewitt (canoeist), Canadian slalom canoeist
Thomas Hewitt (sport shooter) (born 1950), Irish sports shooter
Leatherface's real name in The Texas Chainsaw Massacre 2003 movie and the 2006 prequel

See also
Hewitt (disambiguation)